Sköll is a wolf in Old Norse mythology.

Skoll may also refer to:

 Skoll (moon)
 Skoll Centre for Social Entrepreneurship
 Skoll Foundation, a social entrepreneurship foundation based in California
 Hugh Mingay (born 1974), Norwegian musician known as Skoll
 Jeffrey Skoll (born 1965), Canadian engineer and internet entrepreneur
 Lindsay Skoll, British diplomat

See also
 Skoal (disambiguation)
 Skal (disambiguation)
 Skol (disambiguation)